Ghenadie Moșneaga (born 25 April 1985, Chișinău, Moldavian SSR) is a Moldavian football goalkeeper. Currently he plays for Dinamo-Auto Tiraspol.

Career
He began his career in 2009 at Dacia Chișinău. After playing two seasons he moved to Sfîntul Gheorghe.
In 2015, he signed a contract with Andijan.

Career statistics
He played totally in Moldovan National Division: 70 matches - 10 clean sheets.

Honours

Club
Dacia
 Moldovan National Division (1): 2010-11
 Moldovan Cup runners-up (1): 2009–10

References

External links

Profile at FC Dacia Chișinău

1985 births
Footballers from Chișinău
Moldovan footballers
Living people

Association football goalkeepers
FC Dacia Chișinău players
FK Andijon players
FC Zimbru Chișinău players
FC Dinamo-Auto Tiraspol players
FC Sfîntul Gheorghe players
FC Speranța Crihana Veche players